Robert Graham (15 May 1820 – 26 May 1885) was a 19th-century New Zealand politician in the Auckland area.

Early life
Graham was born in 1820 in the parish of Barony in Glasgow, Scotland. His parents were Barbara Stirling Rennie and the farmer and coal merchant Robert Graham. His brother was David Graham.

Political career
He represented the Southern Division electorate (containing Waikato, Coromandel, the Bay of Plenty, and East Cape) in the 2nd New Zealand Parliament from 1855 to 1860, and then represented the Franklin electorate in the 3rd Parliament and the 4th Parliament from 1861 to 1868, when he resigned.

He was the fifth Superintendent of Auckland from 1862 to 1865. Prior to this, he had represented the Southern Division electorate on the Provincial Council from 1855 to 1857, and he represented the Franklin electorate from 1865 to 1869. Graham was a major proponent of the Panmure Bridge, and formally laid the final cornerstone at a ceremony in October 1865, soon after stepping down as the Superintendent of Auckland.

Death and legacy
Graham died in Auckland on 26 May 1885. In 1999, he was posthumously inducted into the New Zealand Business Hall of Fame.

He has two great-grandsons who (as brothers) have both served as MPs:
Doug Graham was a National MP from 1984 to 1999 and a cabinet minister
Kennedy Graham was a Green Party MP from 2008 to 2017

Notes

References

1820 births
1885 deaths
Members of the New Zealand House of Representatives
Members of the Auckland Provincial Council
Superintendents of New Zealand provincial councils
New Zealand MPs for North Island electorates
19th-century New Zealand politicians
Politicians from Glasgow
Scottish emigrants to New Zealand